The Colfax County War was a range war that occurred from 1873 to 1888 between settlers and the new owners of the Maxwell Land Grant in Colfax County, in the U.S. state of New Mexico. The war started when the new landowners tried to remove the local settlers from the land they had just bought. The locals refused to leave, as they had settled much of their livelihood in the grant, which resulted in conflict and violence in 1875.

Background
The disputed territory began as a land grant from the Mexican provincial governor of Santa Fe de Nuevo México to Charles H. Beaubien and Guadalupe Miranda in 1841, which included large portions of what is now Colfax County in northern New Mexico and Las Animas County in southern Colorado. In 1849, after the region was ceded to the United States at the end of the Mexican–American War, an American pioneer named Lucien B. Maxwell moved to the area, married Beaubien's daughter, and became a part owner and manager of the vast land grant. Over the following decades, many more pioneer families arrived in the area, which was conveniently situated along branches of the Santa Fe Trail. Maxwell was very lenient to visiting settlers, allowing pioneers to settle and ranch on land within the grant, letting Ute and Jicarilla Indians to hunt game in the area, and even leasing claims on minerals to miners.

In 1870, Maxwell sold the grant to a group of English financiers for a reported price of $1.35 million. The new owners formed the Maxwell Land Grant and Railway Company. Their arrival and purchase of the land immediately spurred controversy among the people already living in the area, and animosity quickly developed between the two sides. Property developers working for the company complained that miners and farmers, who they believed were squatters, were disturbing and even harassing their work, presenting various obstacles to the company's production. Many of these settlers were white, Spanish and Native American people who believed that the land was in the public domain or felt that they had been given Maxwell's unwritten permission to live on the grant.

War
A large meeting between the settlers occurred on March 30, 1873, in which they agreed to arm themselves to protect their homes and property if necessary. The event that triggered much of the war, was the murder of Reverend Franklin J. Tolby, a staunch ally of the settlers and squatters opposing the Maxwell Land Grant Company. He was found murdered in Cimarron Canyon on September 14, 1875. It was quickly assumed that someone from the company was responsible, and the blame was pinned on a gunman named Cruz Vega. Vega and his family were originally sided with the Hispanic settlers in the area, and his uncle, Francisco Griego, was one of the leaders among the Hispanic people during the conflict. However, they soon shifted sides when Griego and his family were faced with charges of killing three cavalry men in an altercation in a card game, and also implicated in the suspected murder of another soldier on June 1. They were said to have been blackmailed in exchange for dropping the charges the family would have faced.

With his family's reputation of violence and betrayal, Vega was an easy prime suspect and soon the townspeople, led by notorious gunfighter and advocate of the settlers Robert Clay Allison, formed a mob to hunt him down. After apprehending Cruz Vega, they tortured and hanged him by a pole. The Vega family mourned Cruz's death, and his uncle Francisco swore to avenge him by killing Allison. On November 1, Griego managed to trap and confront Allison in the saloon of the St. James Hotel. As Griego drew his pistol, Allison drew faster and shot Griego twice in the chest, killing him. Days later, Allison was charged with the murder but after an inquiry, the charge was dropped and the shooting was ruled as self-defense. Allison had also killed another gunman by the name of Chunk Colbert in Colfax County the previous year. Company gang members retaliated by conducting night-time raids on the settlers, destroying their property as well as murdering those who fought back. 

Because of the presence of a large lawless element at Cimarron and the inability of local authorities to keep the peace, the attorney general of the New Mexico Territory, under directions from Governor Marsh Giddings, requested federal troops from Fort Union to help Sheriff Isaiah Rinehart restore order at Cimarron. No troops were sent at that time, but troubles continued at Cimarron that eventually required military intervention. The Maxwell Land Grant and Railway Company was also allied with the powerful Santa Fe Ring, a group of influential lawyers and politicians who controlled many Western states. The settlers did not like the incursion of the soldiers on to the land, and this caused a great deal of violence between the factions. Buffalo soldiers of the 9th U.S. Cavalry were among the units sent, and on one occasion, some of them had a shootout with a group of Texas cowboys in the St. James Hotel. Three soldiers died during the shootout and a few months later one of the cowboys Davy Crockett who was involved was killed by the local sheriffs. Clay Allison himself shot and killed a black sergeant in a bar where he was drinking.

A man named Cardenas eventually confessed to the murder of Tolby, and he was subsequently hanged by a group of 20 gunmen on November 10. It has been estimated that as many as 200 people were killed in the Colfax County War. Soon the conflict started to dwindle down between the leaders of each party. Clay Allison was arrested in late 1876 by posse consisting of a sheriff, a captain and lieutenant with 45 U.S. cavalrymen. He later left the county in December of that year. The English owners of the Maxwell Land Grant Company foreclosed on the land by 1879, and the company was purchased by new owners from the Netherlands. 

Finally, in 1885, the lawn of the Colfax County Courthouse was the site of one of the last gun battles of the Colfax County War. A group led by George Curry was assaulted by a group of sheriff's deputies on the courthouse lawn. Curry's brother and one of his followers were killed in the gun battle. Curry pleaded guilty to unlawfully carrying firearms and was fined five dollars. The Dutch owners also faced financial instability and were sued by the United States government in the early 1880s for making claims on land within the public domain in Colorado. On March 8, 1887, the company finally sent its plea to the United States Supreme Court. In its ruling five weeks later, the court confirmed the company's ownership of the land when it concluded “We are entirely satisfied that the Grant, as confirmed by the action of Congress, is a valid grant, that the survey and the patent issued upon it are entirely free from any fraud.”

Some of the settlers left the land but many manage to settle with the company. The conflict calmed down between some of the settlers who were allowed to remain and the land owners who won over the property. However, some were still being evicted as late as 1894. One of the last victims of the war, Richard Russell, was killed in a shootout with company enforcers near his ranch in Stonewall, Colorado, in 1888.

Popular culture
 The 2005 game Gun had a character named Clay Allison who was also leading a resistance similar to that of the Colfax County War.

References

1870s in New Mexico Territory
Pre-statehood history of New Mexico
Conflicts in 1875
Internal wars of the United States
Range wars and feuds of the American Old West